Tsagan-Chelutay (Sagaan Shuluuta) is a rural locality (an ulus) in Kyakhtinsky District, Republic of Buryatia, Russia. The population was 77 as of 2010. There are 3 streets.

Geography 
Tsagan-Chelutay is located 120 km southeast of Kyakhta (the district's administrative centre) by road.

References 

Rural localities in Kyakhtinsky District